Renaissance Cinemas is an Egyptian cinema chain company. It operates 21 cinemas covering 99 screens. Renaissance Cinemas is a subsidiary of Al Arabia Cinema Production & Distribution.

Cinemas
Cairo
Nile City
Bandar Maadi
Teeba Mall
Wonderland
Down Town
Metro Cairo
Faten Hamama
Cairo Mall
Zaytoun
Dandy Mall
October
Alexandria
St. Stefano
City Center
Semouha
Metro Alex
Royal
Other cities
10th of Ramadan
Assiout
Ismailia
Suez

References

External links
 Official Website

Cinemas and movie theaters chains
Film organisations in Egypt
Cinema chains in Egypt